Cheiracanthium  is a spider species found in France.

See also 
 List of Eutichuridae species

References

External links 

fulvotestaceum
Spiders of Europe
Spiders described in 1878